Borom may refer to:
Red Borom (1915-2011), American baseball player

Borom-e Pain, a village in Ilam Province, Iran